Tyler William Prescott (born 10 October 1989), known professionally as Jett Prescott, is an American independent singer-songwriter, multi-instrumentalist, and entrepreneur. Music Connection named Jett Prescott #2 among the top 25 new artists of the year based on their review of his eponymous release, the Jett Prescott EP. Jett was recognized as the top solo musician in Los Angeles by worldwide-leading wedding organization The Knot in 2015. Since founding PennyFly Entertainment in 2017 the company has been acknowledged as the only record label to achieve placement among Pepperdine University's top 100 "Most Fundable Companies". Jett contributes to Rolling Stone as a member of their expert panels.

Early life
Born and raised in central Pennsylvania, Jett spent most of his life focused on academics; specifically computers. With an undeveloped passion to sing and bass guitar skills, he picked up from his father, it wasn't until graduating high school that he discovered his innate love for the piano. Utilizing his experience with computers, Jett turned to various software programs and online tutorials to learn piano and remains entirely self-taught. Upon beginning to play, he did not go a single day without practicing for over two years straight.
"It was an entirely new side of myself that I had discovered, providing absolute emotional therapy - I would utilize the Internet for tutorials on how to play a Billy Joel hit, and within two weeks I would be comfortable playing and singing it entirely. The motivation I found from such quick results turned sitting down and playing into an addiction."
Jett would go on to graduate from Penn State University with a BA in Cyber Security while continuing to teach himself piano and guitar.

Music career
Shortly after starting college, Jett began collaborating with other musicians and performing live through several attempts to form a lasting original band. After attempting to write on his own, he began recording his first release which was entirely self-produced on his laptop. One year later in June 2011, the resulting “Without Wings” demo album was released locally and through popular digital distributors. 500 physical copies were produced, rapidly selling out for $5 each at local performances.

The demo album's success landed a 5-day recording session at the acclaimed Clear Track Studios in Clearwater, Florida. These sessions yielded the 4-track eponymous Jett Prescott EP, mastered by Scott Hull. The independently released EP now sees worldwide rotation on Pandora Internet Radio. Music Connection favorably reviewed the EP and went on to name Jett Prescott #2 among the top 25 new artists from 2013, which followed a homepage feature on music mega-site ReverbNation. “Put Me Down in Wine” was voted #1 on TRS24/7 Radio, received high praise from SongOfTheYear.com, and VEVO independently published the official music video. The indie track continues to get airplay on radio networks including Sirius XMU, The Darryn Yates Show, RevolverUnderground, The Emerge Radio Networks, and GagOrder Network.
Jett Prescott revealed in recent interviews with “New Music Inferno” and red-carpet celebrity interviewer Jeffrey Henderson that he has relocated to Los Angeles from the east coast to focus on the recording of his first full-length album with producers PJ Bianco and Gary Miller. Jett is additionally included on the forthcoming "Set Them Free" album alongside Slash, Fergie, Santana, Rob Thomas, Journey, and other artists in support of the Rock Against Trafficking project. Locals can find Jett performing venues such as The Lighthouse Café and Hollywood's “The Piano Bar”.

PennyFly Entertainment
Shortly after receiving signing offers from Epic and Sony upon his relocation to Los Angeles, Jett made the decision to remain independent by founding PennyFly Entertainment, a "by-artists-for-artists" record company. PennyFly is a full-service entertainment company providing management and marketing services for artists and producers such as Gary Miller, Steve Thompson, Ricky Rebel, and Kim Se-hwang with projects including Rock Against Trafficking and Poo Bear's upcoming reality TV venture known as StarCrowd. PennyFly has worked with a variety of artists including Gabbie Hanna, Kodie Shane, Meredith O'Connor, Mary Wilson, Rebecca Black, Ruggero Pasquarelli, Minzy, and more across several projects.

References

American male singer-songwriters
American male pianists
American male guitarists
Singer-songwriters from Pennsylvania
21st-century American singers
American rock songwriters
American rock pianists
American pop pianists
American pop rock singers
Living people
21st-century American guitarists
21st-century American pianists
Guitarists from Pennsylvania
21st-century American male singers
1989 births